= Lulayyah =

- Location within United Arab Emirates
- Coordinates: 25°23′26″N 56°21′17″E
- Country: United Arab Emirates
- Emirate: Sharjah
- Elevation: 0 m (0 ft)

Lulayyah is a settlement in Sharjah.
